Hill-Woodman-Ffrost House (also known as the Three Chimneys Inn - ffrost Sawyer Tavern) in Durham, New Hampshire is purportedly one of the oldest buildings in the State of New Hampshire and is located within the Durham Historic District. The owners claim that it "has an ell that is believed to date to 1649." The building is currently a hotel known as the Three Chimneys Inn-Ffrost Sawyer Tavern.

History
In 1649 Valentine Hill built a home north of the Oyster River near his mill. The tavern's back ell is alleged by the owners to be Hill's original house, with later additions made by Nathaniel Hill around 1680. In 1694 the house survived a Native American attack which destroyed many of the buildings in the area. Jonathan Woodman eventually inherited the property from his Hill family members; he deeded it to George Frost at some point after 1796, and the Frost family owned it until the 1980s.

See also
List of the oldest buildings in New Hampshire

References

External links
Three Chimneys Inn official website

Buildings and structures in Durham, New Hampshire
Houses in Strafford County, New Hampshire
Houses completed in 1649